László Varga Robert (born 25 August 1987 in Sydney) is a Hungarian football player who currently plays for BFC Siófok.

1987 births
Living people
Hungarian footballers
Győri ETO FC players
Association football midfielders